Iredalea balteata is a species of sea snail, a marine gastropod mollusk in the family Drilliidae.

Description
The length of the shell attains 4 mm.

Distribution
This marine species occurs off the Philippines and off Southern Madagascar.

References

External links
 Specimen at MNHN, Paris

balteata
Gastropods described in 1860